The eleventh season of the television series Dallas aired on CBS during the 1987–88 TV season.

Cast

Starring
In alphabetical order:
 Barbara Bel Geddes as Miss Ellie Ewing Farlow (30 episodes)
 Patrick Duffy as Bobby Ewing (30 episodes)
 Linda Gray as Sue Ellen Ewing (30 episodes)
 Larry Hagman as J.R. Ewing (30 episodes)
 Steve Kanaly as Ray Krebbs (30 episodes)
 Howard Keel as Clayton Farlow (30 episodes)
 Ken Kercheval as Cliff Barnes (30 episodes)
 Priscilla Beaulieu Presley as Jenna Wade Krebbs (27 episodes)

Also Starring
 Jack Scalia as Nicholas Pearce (28 episodes)
 Sheree J. Wilson as April Stevens (28 episodes)
 Andrew Stevens as Casey Denault (26 episodes)
 Leigh Taylor-Young as Kimberly Cryder (19 episodes), billed under "Special Guest Star" status for her first three episodes
 Bert Remsen as Harrison "Dandy" Dandridge (10 episodes)
 Karen Kopins as Kay Lloyd (9 episodes), billed under "Guest Star" status for her first three episodes
 William Smithers as Jeremy Wendell (4 episodes)
 Morgan Brittany as Katherine Wentworth (2 episodes), billed under "Special Guest Star" status for her first appearance
 Charlene Tilton as Lucy Ewing Cooper (2 episodes)

Special Guest Stars
 Annabel Schofield as Laurel Ellis (11 episodes)
 John Anderson as Dr. Herbert Styles (7 episodes)
 Howard Duff as Senator Henry Harrison O'Dell (2 episodes)

Notable guest stars
Minor recurring actors Deborah Marie Taylor (Oil Baron's Club waitress Debbie) and Linda Gray's daughter Kehly Sloane (Sue Ellen's secretary Kelly) join the cast. Amy Stoch (Lisa Alden) appears in a major story-arc, but won't appear in later seasons.

Also - future series star Kimberly Foster, who will portray Michelle Stevens for the final two seasons of the show, makes a minor appearance as an unnamed character in one episode.

A young Brad Pitt appears as a co-star in four episodes of the series playing the role of Randy, the boyfriend of Jenna's daughter Charlie.

Crew 
Unlike previous two seasons, season eleven doesn't bring any major changes among the production team. Executive producer Leonard Katzman remains, as do producer David Paulsen, associate producer Cliff Fenneman, story editor Mitchell Wayne Katzman and story consultant Leah Markus. Arthur Bernard Lewis, who departed at the end of season 8, returns to his former position as supervising producer.

Most of the season's writers are as per the previous season: showrunner Leonard Katzman, David Paulsen, Mitchell Wayne Katzman, Leah Markus and Louella Lee Caraway are joined by the returning Arthur Bernard Lewis.

DVD release
The eleventh season of Dallas' was released by Warner Bros. Home Video, on a Region 1 DVD box set of three double-sided DVDs, on April 21, 2009. Like the other DVD sets of the show's last five seasons, it does not include any extras.

Episodes

References

General references

External links 

1987 American television seasons
1988 American television seasons
Dallas (1978 TV series) seasons